Hronské Kľačany is a village and municipality in the Levice District in the Nitra Region of Slovakia.

Etymology
Slovak Kľačane, see Kľačany the details.

History
In historical records the village was first mentioned in 1275.

Geography
The village lies at an altitude of 166 metres and covers an area of 7.882 km². It has a population of about 1435 people.

Ethnicity
The village is approximately 99% Slovak.

Facilities
The village has a public library, a gym and a football pitch.

Genealogical resources

The records for genealogical research are available at the state archive "Statny Archiv in Nitra, Slovakia"

 Roman Catholic church records (births/marriages/deaths): 1709-1896 (parish B)
 Reformated church records (births/marriages/deaths): 1697-1825 (parish B)

See also
 List of municipalities and towns in Slovakia

References

External links
https://web.archive.org/web/20110226112651/http://app.statistics.sk/mosmis/eng/run.html
Surnames of living people in Hronske Klacany

Villages and municipalities in Levice District